Estonian Weightlifting Federation (abbreviation EWF) is one of the sport governing bodies in Estonia which deals with weightlifting.

EWF history dates back to 1920 when Estonian Sport Union was established; the union also had a weightlifting department. In 1926, EKRAVE Union was established. EWF considers it's actual establishment on 10 April 1933, when Estonian Wrestling-, Boxing- and Weightlifting Union was created. In 1989, EWF is re-established.

EWF is a member of International Weightlifting Federation (IWF).

References

External links
 

Sports governing bodies in Estonia
Weightlifting in Estonia
National members of the European Weightlifting Federation
Sports organizations established in 1933